The 1905 Colgate football team was an American football team that represented Colgate University as an independent during the 1905 college football season. In its third season under head coach Buck O'Neill, the team compiled a 5–4 record. Walter Runge was the team captain. The team played its home games on Whitnall Field in Hamilton, New York.

After the 1905 season, Buck O'Neill left Colgate to become head football coach at Syracuse. He was later inducted into the College Football Hall of Fame.

Schedule

References

Colgate
Colgate Raiders football seasons
Colgate football